International Law and Economics Institute (Russian: Международный институт экономики и права) is a Russian non-state university working primarily with e-learning and distance learning technologies. The Institute has its branches in 29 cities, including Omsk.

Particular qualities 
The Institute has been working in Omsk since 2000. There are two educational formats here: extramural and mixed (remote/in-class). In Institute authorities  (and some students 1) opinion such choice of formats helps students to get working experience while they are studying. There is also possibility to get two diplomas during the time of studying (it is 4years and 8 months for the Bachelor’s degree and 2 years 4 months for Master’s degree, which is available only in the mother school 1 located in Moscow). All teaching staff formulates from Moscow specialists.

Training directions 
At Bachelor degree program there are four specialties

 40.03.01 legal studies
 38.03.01 Economy 
 38.03.02  Management
 38.03.04 State and municipal management

and there are some different training directions inside each.

References 

 https://www.yell.ru/moscow/com/mejdunarodnyiy-institut-ekonomiki-i-prava-miep_1929038/reviews/
 2. https://miep.ru/region/6531/#obuch

Omsk
Education in Omsk Oblast